The Kyūshū J7W Shinden (震電, "Magnificent Lightning")  was a World War II Japanese propeller-driven prototype fighter with wings at the rear of the fuselage, a nose-mounted canard, and pusher engine.

Developed by the Imperial Japanese Navy (IJN) as a short-range, land-based interceptor, the J7W was a response to Boeing B-29 Superfortress raids on the Japanese home islands. For interception missions, the J7W was to be armed with four forward-firing 30 mm type 5 cannons in the nose.

The Shinden was expected to be a highly maneuverable interceptor, but only two prototypes were finished before the end of war. A jet engine–powered version was considered, but never even reached the drawing board.

Design and development
In the IJN designation system, "J" referred to land-based fighters and "W" to Watanabe Tekkōjo, the company that oversaw the initial design.

The idea of a canard-based design originated with Lieutenant Commander Masayoshi Tsuruno, of the technical staff of the IJN in early 1943. Tsuruno believed the design could easily be retrofitted with a turbojet, when suitable engines became available. His ideas were worked out by the First Naval Air Technical Arsenal (Dai-Ichi Kaigun Koku Gijitsusho), which designed three gliders designated Yokosuka MXY6, featuring canards. These were built by Chigasaki Seizo K. K. and one was later fitted with a 22 hp Semi 11 (Ha-90) 4-cylinder air-cooled engine.

The feasibility of the canard design was proven by both the powered and unpowered versions of the MXY6 by the end of 1943, and the Navy were so impressed by the flight testing, they instructed the Kyushu Aircraft Company to design a canard interceptor around Tsuruno's concept. Kyushu was chosen because both its design team and production facilities were relatively unburdened, and Tsuruno was chosen to lead a team from Dai-Ichi Kaigun Koku Gijitsusho to aid Kyushu's design works.

The construction of the first two prototypes started in earnest by June 1944, stress calculations were finished by January 1945, and the first prototype was completed in April 1945. The 2,130 hp Mitsubishi MK9D (Ha-43) radial engine and its supercharger were installed behind the cockpit and drove a six-bladed propeller via an extension shaft. Engine cooling was to be provided by long, narrow, obliquely mounted intakes on the side of the fuselage. It was this configuration that caused cooling problems while running the engine while it was still on the ground. This, together with the unavailability of some equipment parts postponed the first flight of the Shinden.

Even before the first prototype took to the air, the Navy ordered the J7W1 into production, with a quota of 30 Shinden a month given to Kyushu's Zasshonokuma factory and 120 from Nakajima's Handa plant. It was estimated some 1,086 Shinden could be produced between April 1946 and March 1947.

On 3 August 1945, the prototype first flew, with Tsuruno at the controls, from Mushiroda Airfield. Two more short flights were made, a total of 45 minutes airborne, one each on the same days as the atomic bombings of Hiroshima and Nagasaki occurred, before the war's end. Flights were successful, but showed a marked torque pull to starboard (due to the powerful engine), some flutter of the propeller blades, and vibration in the extended drive shaft.

Surviving aircraft

The two prototypes were the only examples of the Shinden ever completed. After the end of the war, one was scrapped; the other was claimed by a U.S. Navy Technical Air Intelligence Unit in late 1945, dismantled, and shipped to the United States. (Some sources claim that the USN took the first built while others state that it was the second.)

The sole surviving J7W1 was reassembled, but has never been flown in the United States; the USN transferred it to the Smithsonian Institution in 1960. Its forward fuselage is currently on display at the Steven F. Udvar-Hazy Center annex (at Dulles Airport) of the National Air and Space Museum in Washington DC. According to the NASM, 'miscellaneous parts' are stored at Building 7C at the older storage/annex facility, the Garber Facility in Suitland, Maryland.

A replica of the J7W1, built by a production company in Tokyo, was unveiled at the Tachiarai Peace Memorial Museum in July 2022.

Specifications (J7W1)

See also

References

Notes

Bibliography

External links

  Kyushu J7W1 Shinden (Magnificent Lightning) -National Air and Space Museum
 WATANABE ENGINEERING CORPORATION (1943-1945 Kyūshū Hikōki K.K.) - About Shinden (in Japanese)
 Kyushu J7W1 Shinden (Japanese site)
 Kyushu J7W Shinden (Magnificent Lightning)
 Shinden on tanks45.tripod.com
 Actual flight test footage on www.youtube.com

J7W
Canard aircraft
J7W, Kyushu
1940s Japanese experimental aircraft
J7W, Kyushu
Single-engined pusher aircraft
History of science and technology in Japan
Aircraft first flown in 1945